Pedro Miguel Costa Ferreira (born 12 May 1991) is a Portuguese footballer who plays as a winger for Italian  club Potenza.

Club career
On 2 September 2019, he returned to Teramo, signing a two-year contract.

References

External links

1991 births
Living people
People from Barcelos, Portugal
Portuguese footballers
Association football midfielders
A.C. Carpi players
U.S. Sassuolo Calcio players
S.S. Teramo Calcio players
A.C.R. Messina players
U.S. Lecce players
Trapani Calcio players
Virtus Entella players
Potenza Calcio players
Serie B players
Serie C players
Portuguese expatriate footballers
Expatriate footballers in Italy
Portuguese expatriate sportspeople in Italy
Sportspeople from Braga District